Johann Georg Röllig (1710–1790) was a German composer, organist and chapel master at Zerbst. From the age of 17, Röllig was a student at the Dresden Kreuzschule. In 1736, he matriculated at the University of Leipzig to study theology. In 1737, Prince Johann August of Anhalt-Zerbst heard Röllig perform and appointed him Court Organist and Court Musician. On the death of court Kapellmeister, Johann Friedrich Fasch, in 1758, Röllig (along with the court Konzertmeister, Carl Hoeckh) assumed some of his duties, particularly in continuing to supply the court with cantatas. Following Hoeckh's death in 1773, Röllig was finally appointed Kapellmeister in 1774.

Works
Musicologists have attributed to Röllig the St. Mark's Passion „Gehet heraus und schauet an, ihr Tochter Zion", previously attributed to C. P. E. Bach by G. Quarg (as H. 863). His other notable output includes special cantatas and serenatas for the birthdays of rulers of Anhalt-Zerbst, including Catherine the Great, daughter of Prince Christian August. In 2019, the local newspaper, the Volksstimme reported that a volume had been bought for the Francisceum Library in Zerbst which contained the texts of several unknown works by Fasch and Röllig. Significant surviving works include Röllig's cantata to mark the death of Adolf Frederick, King of Sweden in 1771 ("Sei getreu bis in den Tod") and a cantata ("Euer Herz soll sich freuen") and Missa brevis to mark the coronation of his successor Gustav III. The latter was published in an edition by Nigel Springthorpe by Prima la musica in 2020.

References

1710 births
1790 deaths